Kim Lankford (born June 14, 1954) is an American businesswoman and retired actress, best known for her role as Ginger Ward on Knots Landing from 1979 to 1983.

Life and career
Lankford was born in Montebello, California. She made her screen debut in the 1976 movie Harry and Walter Go to New York, and later began her television career appearing in episodes of sitcoms such as Happy Days. In 1978, she was cast as the female lead opposite Joe Namath in the short-lived NBC sitcom The Waverly Wonders. Later that year, she played the leading role in the teen comedy film Malibu Beach.

In 1979, Lankford was cast as Ginger Ward, one of the original lead characters, in the CBS prime time soap opera Knots Landing. She starred on the show during the first four seasons, before leaving in 1983. In 1980, she also had a role opposite Chuck Norris in the action film The Octagon, and in the following years co-starred with Don Meredith in the thriller Terror Among Us. After leaving Knots Landing, she guest-starred on Fantasy Island, The Love Boat, and Cheers. In 1988, she had a supporting role in the horror film Cameron's Closet, and was a regular cast member in the ABC detective drama Murphy's Law.

Lankford spent the 1990s playing guest starring roles on television series such as In the Heat of the Night, Chicago Hope and Diagnosis: Murder, as well as appearing in the films Missing Pieces (1992) and Night of the Running Man (1995). In 1996, Lankford was a co-presenter on a cult public-access television cable TV series, "The Count Smokula Show". She reprised her Knots Landing character in Knots Landing: Back to the Cul-de-Sac in 1997. After retiring from acting in 2000, Lankford created her own horse business in Colorado called Kim Lankford's Living Horsemanship.

In the late 1970s and early 1980s, Lankford lived with, and was romantically involved with, Warren Zevon. Lankford was close friends with Susan Berman. Lankford dated Robert Durst, who allegedly murdered Berman in 2000. In 2015, Lankford appeared in the HBO documentary series The Jinx: The Life and Deaths of Robert Durst.

Filmography

Film

Television

References

External links
 
Kim Lankford's Living Horsemanship

American television actresses
American film actresses
Actresses from California
1954 births
Living people
People from Montebello, California
American soap opera actresses
20th-century American actresses
21st-century American women